Asilmetta ("Asella Metta") is a neighborhood in Visakhapatnam of Andhra Pradesh, India. In the olden days, the government collected taxes (''Asellu'' in Telugu) in this area and hence, the name Asilmetta.

Commerce
This is one of the busiest commercial areas in Visakhapatnam City. It is a hub for many shopping malls, educational institutes, food courts, and restaurants. The Sampath Vinayagar Temple is located here. Dwaraka Bus Station is close to this area.

Transport
APSRTC buses are accessible to any part of the city. Dwaraka Bus Station is very close to this area.

Gallery

References

Neighbourhoods in Visakhapatnam